Norman Robinson may refer to:
 Norman Lubbock Robinson (1890-1951), took historic photos of Canada's North
Norm Robinson (1900–1980), Australian rugby league footballer, coach and administrator
Norman Robinson (priest) (1905–1973), Anglican Provost of Blackburn
Frank Norman Robinson (1911–1997), Australian sound recording technician and ornithologist
Norman Robinson (television news reporter) (born 1951), news anchor for WDSU-TV New Orleans Channel 6 (NBC)
Norman Robinson Stakes, an Australian thoroughbred horse race since 1978
Norman Robinson (actor)
Norman Robinson (karate) (born 1936), South African martial artist
Norman Robinson (rugby league), rugby league footballer of the 1940s
Norman Robinson (footballer) (1921–1990), English footballer
Norman Robinson (baseball) (1913–1984), American baseball player